The 1905 Ohio gubernatorial election was held on November 7, 1905. Democratic nominee John M. Pattison defeated incumbent Republican Myron T. Herrick with 50.53% of the vote.

General election

Candidates
Major party candidates
John M. Pattison, Democratic
Myron T. Herrick, Republican 

Other candidates
Isaac Cowan, Socialist
Aaron S. Watkins, Prohibition
John E. Seitger, Socialist Labor

Results

References

1905
Ohio
Gubernatorial